Laze pri Borovnici is a settlement west of Borovnica in the Inner Carniola region of Slovenia.

Name
The name of the settlement was changed from Laze to Laze pri Borovnici in 1953.

References

External links

Laze pri Borovnici on Geopedia

Populated places in the Municipality of Borovnica